Friendship Township may refer to:

 Friendship Township, Greene County, Arkansas, in Greene County, Arkansas
 Friendship Township, Michigan
 Friendship Township, Yellow Medicine County, Minnesota

Township name disambiguation pages